The Anthropocene Extinction is the sixth studio album by American death metal band Cattle Decapitation. It was released on August 7, 2015, on Metal Blade Records. It became Cattle Decapitation's first album to chart on the Billboard 200, debuting at No. 100 (No. 44 on "Top Albums").

Lyrical concept 
The previous record, Monolith of Inhumanity, dealt with the future of Earth, if mankind keeps its current style of life. The Anthropocene Extinction deals with the results of mankind's influence on the environment, such as the Great Pacific garbage patch.

Critical reception 

The album received widespread acclaim from music critics. At Metacritic (a review aggregator site which assigns a normalized rating out of 100 from music critics), based on four critics, the album has received a score of 86/100, which indicates "universal acclaim". Reviews particularly praised Travis Ryan's vocal performance, with Exclaim! writing that "Littered throughout the wasteland of gurgling growls and shrill shrieks that fill The Anthropocene Extinction are the snarls that the vocalist experimented with on 2012's Monolith of Inhumanity, a sort of pseudo-singing that just might be more unsettling than his more traditional death metal scream, and which showcases his impressive range."

About.com praised the variety and songwriting on the album, praising the band's attention to detail: "Cattle Decapitation write albums, a quality that allows each song to fit within the entire grand vision. An interlude like 'The Burden of Seven Billion' may seem like filler, but its placement allows a reprise from a first half of life-draining potency. A similar claim follows the gloomy 'Ave Exitium', which follows in the vein of 'The Harvest Floor' and 'The Monolith' as a haunting intro to a momentous closer in 'Pacific Grim'."

Track listing

Personnel 
Credits are adapted from the album's liner notes.

Cattle Decapitation
 Travis Ryan – vocals, keyboards, drums on "Ave Exitium"
 Josh Elmore – guitars
 Dave McGraw – drums
 Derek Engemann – bass, additional gang vocals on "The Prophets of Loss", keyboards and drums on "The Burden of Seven Billion"

Guest musicians
 Philip H. Anselmo – narration on "The Prophets of Loss"

Additional musicians
 Author & Punisher – intro of "Plagueborne"
 Jürgen Bartsch (Bethlehem) – spoken word on "Pacific Grim"

Production
 Dave Otero – production, mixing, mastering
 Shane Howard – engineering assistance

Artwork and design
 Wes Benscoter – album artwork, photo editing
 Brian Ames – album layout
 Sam Lanthrem – photography
 Denise Ryan – photography
 Zach Cordner – photography
 Travis Ryan – art direction, concept

Studio
 Flatline Audio, Westminster, Colorado – production, mixing, mastering

Charts

References

External links
 
 The Anthropocene Extinction at Metal Blade

2015 albums
Albums produced by Dave Otero
Albums recorded at Flatline Audio
Albums with cover art by Wes Benscoter
Cattle Decapitation albums
German-language albums
Metal Blade Records albums
Albums about climate change
Environmental songs
Anthropocene